The Archaeological Sites of Bat, Al-Khutm and Al-Ayn are a group of necropoleis from the 3rd Millennium BC, located near a palm grove. They were declared World Heritage by UNESCO in 1988.

History or prehistory 

Studies during the last 15 years have shown the existence of numerous human settlements ranging from the Persian Gulf to the Gulf of Oman.

Bat 
The site of Bat is located inside a palm grove. Around 3000 B.C., there was an intense trade of copper (extracted locally) and stone (probably diorite) with Sumerians. These buildings have no outside openings, so besides the possibility of their ritualistic function, they may have been used as tanks or silos. Their precise function is as of yet unknown. In 1972, the excavations carried out by a Danish team led by Karen Frifelt showed that the area has been continuously inhabited for 4000 years.

Al-Khutm 

Al-Ayn 
Al-Ayn is a small necropolis, although it is in the best condition of the three necropolises.

Conservation 
The sites have not been subjected to restoration or other types of conservation before the protection provided by UNESCO, so their isolation has been their only protection. One of the greatest dangers concerning the sites preservation comes from locals who take building material from the archaeological sites.

Development 
A road between Oman and Saudi Arabia, which goes through the villages, was completed in September 2021.

See also 
 Al Ain, a city with archaeological sites in the United Arab Emirates
 Bidaa Bint Saud
 Hili Archaeological Park
 Rumailah, UAE
 Al-Buraimi
 Hafit period
 Ibri
 Jebel Hafit
 Umm al-Nar culture

References

External links 
 New Oman-Saudi desert road will breathe new life into sleepy villages

World Heritage Sites in Oman
Archaeological sites in Oman